Jules Meurisse (3 May 1931 – 26 May 2018) was a Luxembourgian footballer. He played in ten matches for the Luxembourg national football team from 1953 to 1960. He was also part of Luxembourg's team for their qualification matches for the 1954 FIFA World Cup.

References

External links
 

1931 births
2018 deaths
Luxembourgian footballers
Luxembourg international footballers
Sportspeople from Esch-sur-Alzette
Association footballers not categorized by position